Agustina Bessa-Luís, GOSE (15 October 1922 – 3 June 2019) was a Portuguese writer. From 1986 and 1987, she was director of the daily O Primeiro de Janeiro (Porto). From 1990 to 1993, she was director of the D. Maria II National Theatre (Lisbon). Her novels have been adapted for the screen by director Manoel de Oliveira: Fanny Owen ("Francisca"), Abraham's Valley, and The Lands of Risk ("The Convent"), in addition to the Party. Director João Botelho directed A Corte do Norte based on Agustina's homonymous novel.

Awards
She was awarded the Camões Prize in 2004.

Works

 A Sibila (1954; "The Sibyl")
 ESTADOS ERÓTICOS IMEDIATOS DE SÖREN KIERKEGAARD [SØREN KIERKEGAARD'S IMMEDIATE EROTIC STAGES], Is based on Kierkegaard text from  The Seducer's Diary, The immediate erotic stages or the musical-erotic, – popular name: The Don Juan-analysis -, and The Journals, 1992
 Os Incuráveis (1956)
 A Muralha (1957)
 O Susto (1958)
 Ternos Guerreiros (1960)
 O Manto (1961)
 O Sermão do Fogo (1962)
 As Relações Humanas: I – Os Quatro Rios (1964)
 As Relações Humanas: II – A Dança das Espadas (1965)
 As Relações Humanas: III – Canção Diante de uma Porta Fechada (1966)
 A Bíblia dos Pobres: I – Homens e Mulheres (1967)
 A Bíblia dos Pobres: II – As Categorias (1970)
 As Pessoas Felizes (1975)
 Crónica do Cruzado Osb (1976)
 As Fúrias (1977)
 Fanny Owen (1979)
 O Mosteiro (1980)
 Os Meninos de Ouro (1983)
 Adivinhas de Pedro e Inês
 Um Bicho da Terra (1984), a biography of  Uriel da Costa
 Um Presépio Aberto (1984)
 A Monja de Lisboa (1985) a biography of Maria de Visitação
 A Corte do Norte (1987)
 Prazer e Glória (1988)
 A Torre (1988)
 Eugénia e Silvina (1989)
 Vale Abraão (1991)
 Ordens Menores (1992)
 Fake-book (1992) Aphorisms with etchings by Daniel Garbade
 As Terras do Risco (1994)
 O Concerto dos Flamengos (1994)
 Aquário e Sagitário (1995) short story
 Um Outro Olhar sobre Portugal (1995), Voyage with photographs by Pierre Rossollin and Illustrations by Maluda
 Memórias Laurentinas (1996)
 Um Cão que Sonha (1997)
 O Comum dos Mortais (1988)
 A Quinta Essência (1999)
 Dominga (1999)
 Contemplação Carinhosa da Angústia (2000), Anthologie
 O Princípio da Incerteza: I – Jóia de Família (2001)
 O Princípio da Incerteza: II – A Alma dos Ricos (2002)
 O Princípio da Incerteza: III – Os Espaços em Branco (2003)
 Antes do Degelo (2004)
 Doidos e Amantes (2005)
 A Ronda da Noite (2006)

References

Sources
 Jens Staubrand: Kierkegaard International Bibliography Music Works and Plays, Copenhagen 2009. In English and Danish. 

1922 births
2019 deaths
Golden Globes (Portugal) winners
Camões Prize winners
20th-century Portuguese women writers
20th-century Portuguese writers
People from Amarante, Portugal